Austria will be represented by 15 athletes at the 2010 European Athletics Championships held in Barcelona, Spain.

Participants

Men

Track and field events

Field events

Combined events

Women

Track and road events

Field events

Results

References 
 Participants list (men)
 Participants list (women)

2010
Nations at the 2010 European Athletics Championships
European Athletics Championships